Ron Cassidy (born July 23, 1957) was an American football wide receiver in the National Football League. He was drafted by the Green Bay Packers in the 8th round of the 1979 NFL Draft. Cassidy played in 60 games for the Packers in 1979-1981 and 1983–1984, catching 14 passes for 233 yards.

References

1957 births
Living people
American football wide receivers
Green Bay Packers players
Ed Block Courage Award recipients